Rayfield is an English surname. Notable people with the name include:

People
 Dan Rayfield, American politician from Oregon
 Donald Rayfield (born 1942), British professor and writer
 Emily Rayfield, British palaeontologist
 Gordon Rayfield, American television writer
 John M. Rayfield (1926–2010), American politician from North Carolina
 Lee Rayfield (born 1955), Anglican Bishop of Swindon
 Wallace Rayfield (1874–1941), African American architect
 Walter Leigh Rayfield (1881–1949), Canadian recipient of the Victoria Cross
 Rayfield Dupree (born 1953), American athlete
 Rayfield Wright (1945–2022), American football offensive tackle

Other
Split Lip Rayfield, sometimes called "Rayfield", a vocal and (acoustic) instrumental group from Wichita, Kansas.  
Rayfield (automobile)
Rayfield v Hands, 1960 UK company law case

See also
Rayfiel, surname